Oneiric most commonly refers to:
 Dreams, during sleep
 Oneirology, the science of dreams

Oneiric may also refer to:
 Oneiric (film theory), dreams as a metaphor for film—or in critiques thereof
 Oneiric (album), 2006, by Boxcutter
 Oneiric Diary (EP), 2020, by IZ*ONE
 Oneiric Gardens, a 2014 adventure video game
 Oneiric Ocelot, a 2011 Ubuntu operating system

See also 
 Dream (disambiguation)
 Dreamy (disambiguation)
 Oneirism or daydreaming
 Oneiros, in Greek mythology
 Oneiromancy, dream-based divination